Fruitport may refer to the following places in the U.S. state of Michigan:

 Fruitport Charter Township, Michigan
 Fruitport, Michigan, a village within the township